The 1986–87 Yugoslav First League title was awarded to FK Partizan, as the 6 points deduction that originally made Vardar Skopje champions, was declared invalid.

League table

Standing before the court annulled point deductions:

Results

Winning squad

Top scorers

See also
1986–87 Yugoslav Second League
1986–87 Yugoslav Cup

External links
Yugoslavia Domestic Football Full Tables

Yugoslav First League seasons
Yugo
1986–87 in Yugoslav football